Middle Brook may refer to:

Middle Brook, Missouri, an unincorporated community
Middle Brook (Raritan River tributary), in Somerset County, New Jersey
Middle Brook (New York), a river in Delaware and Schoharie Counties

See also
Middlebrook (disambiguation)